The following tables of consonants and vowels (jamo) of the Korean alphabet (Hangul) display (in blue) the basic forms in the first row and their derivatives in the following row(s). They are separated into tables of initials (leading consonants), vowels (medial) and finals (trailing consonants).

The jamo shown below are individually romanized according to the Revised Romanization of Hangeul (RR Transliteration), which is a system of transliteration rules between the Korean and Roman alphabets, originating from South Korea. However, the tables below are not sufficient for normal transcription of the Korean language as the overarching Revised Romanization of Korean system takes contextual sound changes into account.

Leading consonants 
Called choseong, or "initials", there are 19 initial consonants, whereof one (ㅇ) is silent, and five (ㄲ, ㄸ, ㅃ, ㅆ, ㅉ) are doubled:

Medial vowels 
Called jungseong, or "vowels", there are 21 medial vowels:

Trailing consonants 
Called jongseong, or "finals", there are 27 final consonants; with the additional case of no final consonant, there is a total of 28 possibilities:

Collation 
Several collation sequences are used to order words (like alphabetical sorting). The North and South differ on (a) the treatment of composite jamo consonants in syllable-leading (choseong) and -trailing (jongseong) position, and (b) on the treatment of composite jamo vowels in syllable-medial (jungseong) position.

This first sequence is official in South Korea (and is the basic binary order of codepoints in Unicode):

Sequences of this second type are common in North Korea:

Letter names

Consonants 

* Consonant names in the 15th century seem to have ended in a vowel (without adding the last consonant repeating a shortened version of the initial), judging from 1451 Hunmin Jeongeum Eonhae's forms such as "", which may have been pronounced geuneun.

Vowels 
The "names" of the vowels are given according to the sound they make (their pronunciation). To be technical, the silent consonant would be added before the sound (e.g., ㅏ becomes 아).

Hangul syllables

With 19 possible initial consonants, 21 possible medial (one- or two-letter) vowels, and 28 possible final consonants (of which one corresponds to the case of no final consonant), there are a total of  theoretically possible "Korean syllable letters" which are contiguously encoded in the 11,172 Unicode code points from U+AC00 through U+D7A3 (Decimal: = 44,032 + 11,171) within the Hangul Syllables Unicode block.  However, the majority of these theoretically possible syllables do not correspond to syllables found in actual Korean words or proper names.

Jump to tables with initial letter:

See also
 Korean alphabet
 List of Hangul jamo

 Consonant and vowel tables